Cytokine-inducible SH2-containing protein is a protein that in humans is encoded by the CISH gene. CISH orthologs have been identified in most mammals with sequenced genomes. CISH controls T cell receptor (TCR) signaling, and variations of CISH with certain SNPs are associated with susceptibility to bacteremia, tuberculosis and malaria.

Function 

The protein encoded by this gene contains a SH2 domain and a SOCS box domain. The protein thus belongs to the cytokine-induced STAT inhibitor (CIS), also known as suppressor of cytokine signaling (SOCS) or STAT-induced STAT inhibitor (SSI), protein family. CIS family members are known to be cytokine-inducible negative regulators of cytokine signaling.

The expression of this gene can be induced by IL-2, IL-3, GM-CSF and EPO in hematopoietic cells. Proteasome-mediated degradation of this protein has been shown to be involved in the inactivation of the erythropoietin receptor.

CISH is induced by T cell receptor (TCR) ligation and negatively regulates it by targeting the critical signaling intermediate PLC-gamma-1 for degradation. The deletion of Cish in effector T cells has been shown to augment TCR signaling and subsequent effector cytokine release, proliferation and survival. The adoptive transfer of tumor-specific effector T cells knocked out or knocked down for CISH resulted in a significant increase in functional avidity and long-term tumor immunity. There are no changes in activity or phosphorylation of Cish's purported target, STAT5 in either the presence or absence of Cish.

In human tumor-infiltrating lymphocytes (TIL), CISH expression has been reported to be inversely expressed with known T cell activation/exhaustion markers and regulates their expression and neoantigen reactivity. Combination therapy with checkpoint blockade synergistically results in profound tumor regressing in a pre-clinical tumor model

Model organisms

Model organisms have been used in the study of CISH function. A conditional knockout mouse line, called Cishtm1a(KOMP)Wtsi was generated as part of the International Knockout Mouse Consortium program — a high-throughput mutagenesis project to generate and distribute animal models of disease to interested scientists — at the Wellcome Trust Sanger Institute.

Male and female animals underwent a standardized phenotypic screen to determine the effects of deletion. Twenty four tests were carried out on mutant mice, however no significant abnormalities were observed.

Interactions 

CISH has been shown to interact with IL2RB and Growth hormone receptor. and PLCG1.

References

Further reading

External links
 

Genes mutated in mice